The Mount Cottrell massacre involved the murder of an estimated 10 Wathaurong people near Mount Cottrell in the colony of Victoria in 1836, in retaliation for the killing of two European settlers.

Description

On 16 July 1836, a number of Aboriginal people of a single Wathaurong (previously thought to be possibly  Woiworrung) clan were murdered in retaliation for the killing of squatter Charles Franks and his convict shepherd Thomas Flinders. Estimates of the number of victims vary between 5 and 35, with recent research by the University of Newcastle's Colonial Frontier Massacres in Australia, 1788-1930 database putting the number of dead at 10 Wathawurrung people.

Franks, in partnership with George Smith and George Armytage, selected a run near Mount Cottrell, just to the west of where members of the Port Phillip Association had appropriated their land in the Port Phillip District of New South Wales. Franks had arrived at Point Gellibrand (modern day Williamstown) on 23 June with 500 sheep and had reached the Mount Cottrell area by 2 July. Franks and Smith pitched their tent close to thick bushland "about eight miles" from the nearest station.

Smith left the camp to get supplies from the port. Soon afterwards, Franks and Flinders were visited by five Aboriginal people (two men, two women and a boy).

Squatters Armytage and Malcolm discovered the remains of Franks and Flinders near their hut after a period of them being missing. Their bodies had been mutilated.

A group of men gathered at Franks’ station to set out to find the murderers, with Aboriginal trackers, including a Bunorong man called Derrimut. A few days later a group of about 80 natives were tracked down. The party of 17 menHenry Batman, Mr Guy, George Hollins, Michael Leonard, David Pitcairn, Alexander Thomson, William Winberry, John Wood; Aboriginal men Benbow, Derrimut, Baitlange (Ben Benger) and Ballyan, and Sydney Aboriginal men Bullett, Stewart and Joe the marine went in search of the perpetrators, armed with muskets. They tracked a group of about 80 Aboriginal people to Mount Cottrell area and watched them during the evening.

Some early media reports of the incident stated that 5 Aboriginal people were killed, while according to Aboriginal oral history, there were 35 victims. 21st-century research by the University of Newcastle suggests that ten were killed.

The Cornwall Chronicle (published in Tasmania) reported a few days later that the party had succeeded in "annihilating them".

Aftermath 

Media at the time were divided, as the "Colony has to deplore the loss of one of its brightest ornaments". Some championed the revenge:The barbarous murders of Mr. Franks and his shepherd, have been, in some degree, revenged, which, we trust, will be a warning to the natives, not in future to commit wanton excesses upon our countrymen.

Others were critical of the lawless nature of the killing. The Tasmanian Colonial Times editorialised:This will not end here - a tribe swept off from the face of the earth so illegally - so diabolically - will require retributive justice.

Good heaven! Is a whole community to be murdered in cold blood for the offence of three? - This is indeed visiting the sins of the father upon the children. Every human being, save the Port Philip jobbers, will look with horror on such proceedings; and this very act alone ought to destroy the settlement.

Newly appointed Port Phillip Magistrate William Lonsdale landed at Point Gellibrand months later (around late September 1836) to formalise the settlement of Melbourne, after which he undertook an investigation into the incident. Party members were interviewed and admitted firing on the Aboriginal group, but said that they were unaware if any were wounded.

The event was notable at the time, as Franks was the first free settler to be killed (convicts had been killed previously) in frontier violence in new European colony of Port Phillip. The reprisal raid foreshadowed similar conflict that would take place across Victoria's western district.

See also
 List of massacres of Indigenous Australians

References

Further reading
 
 

Massacres in 1836
History of Australia (1788–1850)
1836 in Australia
July 1836 events
Massacres of Indigenous Australians